The men's 50 metre rifle three positions event at the 2016 Olympic Games took place on 14 August 2016 at the National Shooting Center.

The medals were presented by Danka Barteková, IOC member, Slovakia and Olegario Vázquez Raña, President of the International Shooting Sport Federation.

Records
Prior to this competition, the existing world and Olympic records were as follows.

Results

Qualification round

Final

References

Shooting at the 2016 Summer Olympics
Men's 050m 3 positions 2016
Men's events at the 2016 Summer Olympics